November 1918: A German Revolution is a tetralogy of novels by German writer Alfred Döblin about the German Revolution of 1918–1919.  The four volumes—Vol. I: Bürger und Soldaten (Citizens and Soldiers), Vol. II Verratenes Volk (A People Betrayed), Vol. III, Heimkehr der Fronttruppen (Return of the Frontline Troops), and Vol. IV, Karl und Rosa (Karl and Rosa)—together comprise the most significant work from Döblin's period of exile (1933–1945). The work was highly praised by figures such as Bertolt Brecht, and critic Gabriele Sander has described the tetralogy as representing the culmination of Döblin's work in the genre of the historical novel. It deals with the German revolution of 1918-19.

Notes

References

Further reading
 Dollenmayer, David B. The Berlin Novels of Alfred Döblin: Wadzek's Battle with the Steam Turbine, Berlin Alexanderplatz, Men Without Mercy, and November 1918. Berkeley: University of California Press, 1988. Print.
 Hofmann, Klaus. "Revolution and Redemption: Alfred Döblin's November 1918." The Modern Language Review, Vol. 103, No. 2 (Apr., 2008), pp. 471–489.
 
  
 

Novels by Alfred Döblin
German historical novels
German literature
1930s novels
1940s novels
German Revolution of 1918–1919